Dmitri Vladimirovich Yashin (born 27 October 1981) is a Russian former professional footballer.

Club career
He made his professional debut in the Russian Second Division in 1999 for FC Volga Ulyanovsk.

He made his Russian Football National League debut for FC Dynamo Makhachkala on 14 August 2006 in a game against FC Metallurg Krasnoyarsk.

References

External links
 

1981 births
Sportspeople from Tashkent
Living people
Russian footballers
FC Lada-Tolyatti players
FC KAMAZ Naberezhnye Chelny players
FC Ural Yekaterinburg players
FC Shinnik Yaroslavl players
Association football goalkeepers
FC Kuban Krasnodar players
FC Volga Ulyanovsk players
FC Dynamo Makhachkala players